Eduard Vladimirovich Mor (born 4 October 1977) is a retired Russian professional footballer.

Club career
He made his debut in the Russian Premier League in 1999 for FC Spartak Moscow.

Honours
 Russian Premier League champion: 1999, 2000.

References

External links
 

1977 births
Living people
Ukrainian footballers
Russian footballers
Russia under-21 international footballers
Association football defenders
Ukrainian expatriate footballers
Russian expatriate footballers
Expatriate footballers in Russia
Expatriate footballers in Ukraine
Expatriate footballers in Belarus
Russian Premier League players
Ukrainian Premier League players
FC Khimik Severodonetsk players
FC Zorya Luhansk players
FC Spartak Moscow players
FC Saturn Ramenskoye players
FC Chernomorets Novorossiysk players
FC Volyn Lutsk players
FC Oryol players
FC Khimki players
FC Torpedo Moscow players
FC Vitebsk players
FC Luch Vladivostok players
FC Spartak-2 Moscow players